Acidicapsa acidiphila  is a mesophilic and moderately acidophilic bacterium from the genus of Acidicapsa which has been isolated from acidic water in Cueva de la Mora (cave of the mulberry) in Spain.

References

External links
Type strain of Acidicapsa acidiphila at BacDive -  the Bacterial Diversity Metadatabase

Acidobacteriota
Bacteria described in 2017